Montague John Guest (29 March 1839 – 9 November 1909), was a British Liberal politician.

Family
A member of the prominent Guest family, he was the third son of Sir John Josiah Guest, 1st Baronet, and his second wife Lady Charlotte, daughter of Albemarle Bertie, 9th Earl of Lindsey. Ivor Guest, 1st Baron Wimborne, was his elder brother, while Ivor Guest, 1st Viscount Wimborne, Frederick Edward Guest, Henry Guest and Oscar Guest were his nephews.

Guest died in November 1909, aged 70. He never married.

Career
He entered Parliament for Youghal in a 1869 by-election, a seat he held until 1874, and later represented Wareham from 1880 to 1885.

Guest was associated with freemasonry from 1867, and served as Provincial Grand Master of Dorset Freemasons until he resigned in 1902. He was elected chairman of White's for the year 1905.

References

External links 

1839 births
1909 deaths
Members of the Parliament of the United Kingdom for County Cork constituencies (1801–1922)
Members of the Parliament of the United Kingdom for English constituencies
Younger sons of baronets
UK MPs 1868–1874
UK MPs 1880–1885
Montague